Etta Cameron (Ettamae Louvita Coakley; 21 November 1939 – 4 March 2010) was a Bahamian–Danish singer. She especially sang jazz and gospel, and left her mark in the Danish music culture through her entire career from her arrival in Denmark in the 1970s. She was made a Knight of Dannebrog in 1997.

Cameron was also well known as one of the judges in the first two seasons of Scenen er din, the Danish version of the American TV show Star Search.

Cameron was born in Nassau, Bahamas. From 1967 till 1972 she lived in East Berlin which she used as a base for getting performance commitments in Eastern and Western Europe. Popular claims that she had lost her passport and has thereafter been forced to stay in the GDR for five years have been proven wrong. In 1972 Cameron moved to Denmark.

Her daughter Debbie Cameron, born in Miami, Florida, in 1958, also moved to Denmark in 1978, where she, too, established a musical career, not least representing Denmark twice in the Eurovision Song Contest, in 1979 and 1981 along with Tommy Seebach. 

Cameron died on 4 March 2010 in Aarhus, Denmark, after a long illness.

Solo discography 
The following albums have been published by Etta Cameron:

 Come together with Etta (1975)
 I'm a Woman (1976)
 Mayday (1980)
 Easy (1981)
 My Gospel (1987)
 A Gospel Concert with Etta Cameron (1995)
 Lovesongs (1995)
 Etta Cameron mit NDR Big Band (1996)
 Certainly Lord (1996)
 My Christmas (1996)
 'Etta Cameron Ole Kock Hansen and Tuxedo Big Band (1998)
 A Gospel Concert with Etta Cameron vol. 2 (1996)
 I Have a Dream (2000)
 Lady Be Good (2003)
 Her vil ties, her vil bies (2005)
 Spirituals (2008)
 Etta (2009)

Filmography 
Mit mir nich, Madam (1969)
Peter von Scholten (1987)
Mimi og madammerne (1998)

Literature 
 Hun gav smerten vinger  (English: She Gave the Pain Wings) (2007)

References

1939 births
2010 deaths
Gospel singers
People from Nassau, Bahamas